HMS Inglefield was an  leader built for the Royal Navy that served during World War II. She was the navy's last purpose-built flotilla leader. She was named after the 19th century Admiral Sir Edward Augustus Inglefield (1820–1894), and is so far the only warship to carry the name of that seafaring family. In May 1940, her pennant number was changed to I02.

Description
The I-class ships were improved versions of the preceding H-class. She was powered by two Parsons geared steam turbines, each driving one propeller shaft, using steam provided by three Admiralty three-drum boilers. Her crew numbered 175 officers and ratings.

The ship mounted five 4.7-inch (120 mm) Mark IX guns in single mounts, designated 'A', 'B', 'X' and 'Y' from bow to stern. For anti-aircraft (AA) defence, Inglefield was fitted with two quadruple mounts for the 0.5 inch Vickers Mark III machine gun. The I class was fitted with two above-water quintuple torpedo tube mounts amidships for  torpedoes. One depth charge rack and two throwers were fitted; 16 depth charges were originally carried, but this increased to 35 shortly after the war began. The I-class ships were fitted with the ASDIC sound detection system to locate submarines underwater.

Anti-submarine action
On the outbreak of war, Inglefield was deployed as the leader of the 3rd Destroyer Flotilla, Mediterranean Fleet, and was based at Malta. However, she was transferred to the Home Fleet before the end of September 1939 to patrol the Western Approaches. In this rôle, she escorted the aircraft carrier , but was answering a distress signal from  when Courageous was attacked and sunk. Inglefield searched in vain for the U-boat  that sank the carrier. She again came under attack from Nazi U-boats when  fired numerous torpedoes at her; they all missed. A few days after that last attack, the ship was required to tow the submarine  back to Stavanger, after she was damaged while on patrol in the North Sea. Inglefield sank another German U-boat, in early 1940 with the help of her sister  and the submarine ; 24 Germans were rescued.

Operation Weserübung
In May 1940, after the failure of British forces in Norway, Inglefield was called upon to evacuate British troops from the Norwegian town of Åndalsnes. It was a slow trip as Electras bow was damaged. Things were not helped by a violent storm which lasted for half of the journey time, during which, an ammunition locker on Electras forecastle broke loose and started sliding around the deck.

Pursuing German battleships
It was believed that she was the heavy cruiser , and a massive naval effort by the Royal Navy failed to stop her from returning to a German port.

In August, she was present at Scapa Flow for a visit by King George VI, and even embarked the King for the review of the fleet and then for return passage to the mainland on 9 August.

Convoy defence
She was part of the escort for the first convoy to the USSR, along with the aircraft carriers , and then . She would regularly return to escort duties in the Arctic, as she was often deployed with the Home Fleet. But occasionally she was sent elsewhere on a particular mission. One example was in early 1942 when she supported commando raids on the Norwegian coast and bombarded Florø with her sister ship , an action which sank three ships and damaged on-shore factories.  Another example was in April 1942 when she was also deployed to the Mediterranean to escort the American carrier  to Malta in April 1942. On 3 July 1942, she was detached from an Arctic convoy to search for the German battleship , which was reported to have left her normal anchorage. In 1943, she was transferred from Arctic convoy duty to Atlantic convoy defence, but she still spent much of her time in home waters.

Italian invasion

Her next major deployment was in July 1943, when she took part in the invasion of Sicily. Inglefields main role was to search for U-boats and to bombard enemy positions ashore. Throughout the operations on Sicily, she was based at Malta. When the invasion of Italy took place, Inglefield supported the landings at Salerno in a similar way. After the beachhead was established, she formed the escort back to home waters, but was soon sent back to the Mediterranean Sea for operations in Italy. One task was to escort , with British Prime Minister Winston Churchill on board, from Algiers to Alexandria.

During Operation Shingle in early 1944, Inglefield carried out a diversionary bombardment of Civitavecchia to draw Axis forces away from Anzio. She then bombarded the coastal road at Formia for two days before supporting forces on the ground at Anzio. The ship operated out of Naples, ferrying supplies and troops to the battle, as well as continuing to provide covering fire and bombardment of coastal roads.

Last action
On 15 February 1944, she escorted an ammunition ship from Naples to Anzio.  She then took up a defensive position to protect the anchorage in Anzio.  She was in this capacity for ten days before sustaining a direct hit by a Henschel Hs 293 glider bomb launched by II./KG 100 during a dusk attack and was sunk with the loss of 35 lives. 157 survivors were rescued and returned to the United Kingdom. Among the survivors was Jack Rumbold, the last officer to abandon ship and who was mentioned in dispatches for his actions during the sinking.

See also
List of ships sunk by missiles

Notes

Bibliography

External links
 HMS Inglefield, destroyer
 Convoy JW 53
 uboat.net

 

I-class destroyers of the Royal Navy
Ships built on the River Mersey
1936 ships
World War II destroyers of the United Kingdom
Destroyers sunk by aircraft
World War II shipwrecks in the Mediterranean Sea
Maritime incidents in February 1944
Ships sunk by German aircraft